Ewa Pacuła (born in 1971) began her modeling career in the United States at the age of a nineteen in 1990 thanks to help from her sister Joanna Pacuła who already established herself in Hollywood. Her first individual photo session was arranged at her home in Los Angeles. Ewa soon began to appear on the catwalk, promoting such collections as the Emporio Armani. Later, she signed a contract with the modeling agency in Miami. Although she also received an offer to work in Paris, she declined and in 1993 returned to Poland and began modeling for the Polish high-fashion market.

Pacuła became a TV presenter in the late 1990s and appeared in Canal + regular programs, and later was the hostess of TV program Warszawianka at the TVN Warsaw. She currently hosts a program called Dobrenocki for the Polsat Cafe. She played recurring roles on Now or never! and Tenants. In 2005, she posed for the Polish edition of "Playboy".

References

1971 births
Polish female models
Living people
Polish television personalities
People from Tomaszów Lubelski County